The St. John's Cathedral School (also referred to as "St. John's" or simply "SJ") is a Catholic private school teaching run by the Archdiocese of Lingayen-Dagupan in the Philippines.  It is the one of the oldest Catholic School in Dagupan, tracing its roots to 1957 when the school was founded. It remained a Catholic institution through various generations, offering primary and secondary education.

The Saint John's Cathedral School offers programs in the elementary, and secondary levels. Known for its liberal arts tradition, the humanities are a key feature of Catholic education at primary and secondary levels of study. It also has senior high schools and over 2,000 high schools and over 1,500 elementary students.

External links
St. John's Cathedral School

Schools in Dagupan